Con Todo Respeto is a 2004 covers album by the Mexican band Molotov.  The album was released in October 2004 by the label Universal Latino. The songs covered are from a variety of genres, including new wave, hip hop music, punk, and traditional music of Mexico. The title, in apparent reference to the playful cover tracks throughout, means "with all due respect" in Spanish.

This album received a Latin Grammy Award for Best Rock Vocal Album, Duo or Group at the Latin Grammy Awards of 2005.

Track listing 
 "Amateur" (cover of "Rock Me Amadeus" by Falco)
 "Diseño Rolas" (cover of "Designer Music" by Lipps Inc)
 "Marciano" (Martian) (cover of "I Turned into a Martian" by The Misfits)
 "The Revolution Will Not Be Televised (La Revo)" (cover of the original by Gil Scott-Heron)
 "La Boa A Go-Go" (The Boa Go Go) (cover of "La Boa" by La Sonora Santanera)
 "Chavas" (cover of "Girls" by Beastie Boys)
 "Mamar" (cover of "Mamá" by Los Amantes de Lola)
 "Quen Pon-Ponk" (Who Bu-Bunk) (cover of "Quen Pompó" by Chico Che)
 "Da Da Da" (cover of "Da Da Da" by Trio)
 "Perro Negro Granjero" (Farmer Black Dog) ("mash" of El Tri's "Perro Negro" and ZZ Top's "La Grange")
 "Agüela" (Grandma) ("mash" of "Mi Abuela" by Wilfred y La Ganga, "The Magnificent Seven" by The Clash, "Bust A Move" by Young MC and Matt Dike) and "Voto Latino" by Molotov
 "Mi Agüita Amarilla" (My Yellow Water) (cover of the original by Los Toreros Muertos)

2005 Re-edit 

In mid-2005, a re-edit of this album was released, this time including the track «Me Vale Vergara», dedicated to the owner of Mexican soccer team Guadalajara's Chivas, businessman Jorge Vergara. This track includes references to the band's antipathy towards Vergara because of decisions he made in that club. The song was also motivated by Vergara's disparaging comment «Me pareció ver a un lindo gatito» ("I though I saw a pussy cat" or "I tawt I taw a puddy tat" in Spanish) when speaking about Mexican soccer club Pumas de la UNAM.

Originally, Me Vale Vergara circulated freely on the Internet as a demo version, so when the band decided to include it in the re-edit, it had some arrangements made. The track includes collaborations by Pumas de la UNAM team players such as "Parejita" López, Leandro Augusto, and Aílton da Silva.

For this special edition of the album, the cover design was changed, with a black background instead of the white background in the first version. There are a few added demos of some tracks, as well as a DVD with the music videos for "Amateur" and "Marciano", including a promo and a "behind the cameras" special.

This re-edit was released only in Mexico and the US under the name Con Todo Respeto, Unlimited Edition.

Track listing 
 Amateur
 Diseño rolas
 Marciano II (Punk Version)
 The Revolution Will Not be Televised (demo version)
 La Boa a go-go (demo version)
 Chavas
 Mamar
 Quen Pon-Ponk (demo version)
 Da da da
 Perro negro granjero
 Agüela
 Mi agüita amarilla (demo version)
 Me vale vergara
 Marciano
 The Revolution Will Not Be Televised (La Revo)
 La boa a go-go
 Quen Pon-Ponk
 Mi agüita amarilla
 Marciano veloz (demo version)

Sales and certifications

References 

2004 albums
Molotov (band) albums
Covers albums
Universal Music Latino albums
Latin Grammy Award for Best Rock Album by a Duo or Group with Vocal